Acraea pseudatolmis, the false scarlet acraea, is a butterfly in the family Nymphalidae. It is mostly found in eastern Zimbabwe.

Description
Very similar to Acraea nohara qv. for differences.

Biology
The habitat consists of montane grassland.

Adults are on wing year round.

The larvae feed on Basananthe sandersonii and Tricliceras longipedunculatum.

Taxonomy
The species group is undetermined -   but see also Pierre & Bernaud, 2014

References

Butterflies described in 1912
pseudatolmis
Endemic fauna of Zimbabwe
Butterflies of Africa